Strindheim is a neighbourhood in the city of Trondheim in Trøndelag county, Norway.  It is located in the borough of Østbyen. It is the site of Strindheim Church, Strindheim School, the confectionery factory Nidar and the home area of Strindheim IL (Strindheim Idrettslag).

References

Geography of Trondheim
Neighbourhoods of Trondheim